Chess of the Wind also titled The Chess Game of the Wind is a 1976 Iranian film written and directed by Mohammad Reza Aslani. This film was screened only once before the 1979 revolution in Iran and was accompanied by negative reception. But after being rediscovered in 2020, the film was released in different countries and was well received.

Synopsis 

In an aristocratic family, the head of the family - Khanom Bozorg - dies. Her heir is Khanom Kouchak, a paralyzed girl. There is a dispute between the Khanom Kouchak, the maid, the nanny and the stepfather's nephews over the possession of the family wealth.

Cast 

 Fakhri Khorvash
 Mohamad Ali Keshavarz
 Shohreh Aghdashloo
 Akbar Zanjanpour
 Shahram Golchin
 Hamid Taati
 Aghajan Rafii
 Anik Shefrazian
 Majid Habibpur
 Javad Javadi
 Javad Rajavar
 Ali Ahmadi

Inspiration and related works 

Aslani cited Johannes Vermeer as an inspiration for daytime scenes and Georges de La Tour as inspiration for the nighttime scenes. Georges de La Tour's use of central light sources in his paintings, as well as his willingness to have portions of the painting either over- or under-exposed, intrigued him. Aslani also referenced Barry Lyndon'''s approach to light, but stressed that he and Kubrick are different directors with different attitudes. Chess of the Wind'' includes film tinting reminiscent of some silent films.

Reception 
 Hossein Eidizadeh wrote in Lola Journal:

Rediscovery 

The original negatives were presumed lost, yet rediscovered by the director's children in a junk shop in 2014. Reception was positive after a restored film was screened in 2020. Robin Baker, head curator of the BFI National Archive said it will "impact" the "world film canon". Baker praised its "ambition", finding it "shocking" and unique in relation to film as well as Iranian culture.

As of 2021, Janus Films currently owns the North American distribution rights to the film.

The film was released on Blu-ray and DVD by The Criterion Collection in September of 2022 as part of Martin Scorsese’s World Cinema Project series.

See also 

 2020 Cannes Film Festival

References

External links 

 
 
 
 
 

1976 films
Gay-related films
1970s Persian-language films
Lesbian-related films
Iranian LGBT-related films
Films set in Tehran
1970s rediscovered films